Diolkides was a town of ancient Bithynia. 

Its site is located opposite Zeytin Burnu, in Asiatic Turkey.

References

Populated places in Bithynia
Former populated places in Turkey
History of Kocaeli Province